Ray Shirley (born ?) is an American actress.

Career
Ray Shirley appeared in the 2008 film Angus, Thongs and Perfect Snogging as Woman with the Poodle.

Shirley co-stars in the 2012 film Dark Shadows as Mrs. Johnson, the manor's elderly maid. Dark Shadows, which stars Johnny Depp, was directed by Tim Burton.

Filmography

References

External links

American film actresses
Living people
Year of birth missing (living people)
21st-century American women